Stefański (feminine: Stefańska, plural: Stefańscy) is a Polish-language surname. It may be derived either from the place name Stefany or from the given name Stefan (Stephen).  The name was recorded in Poland at least since 1775.

The surname may refer to:

 Alexander Danieliuk-Stefanski (1897–1937), Polish communist
 Benjamin Stefanski (born 1987), British DJ
 Bud Stefanski (born 1955), Canadian ice hockey player
 Ed Stefanski, American sports executive
 Daniel Stefański (born 1977), Polish football referee
 Halina Czerny-Stefańska (1922–2001), Polish pianist
 John Stefanski, American attorney and politician serving as a member of the Louisiana House of Representatives
 Józef Stefański (1908-1997), Polish olympic cyclist
 Kevin Stefanski (born 1982), American football coach
 Larry Stefanki (born 1957), American tennis player and coach
 Mike Stefanski (born 1969), American baseball player
 Patryk Stefański (born 1990), Polish footballer
 Stanisław Stefański (born 1947), Polish olympic sailor
 Walenty Stefański (1813–1877), Polish publisher and political activist
 Włodzimierz Stefański (born 1949), Polish volleyball player

See also

References

Polish-language surnames